Roman Aleksandrov (born October 19, 1976) is a Kazakhstan journalist, editor, television and radio personality, television and radio host, television producer, event promoter, master of ceremonies, public relations specialist, events and communications manager. He is a member of Club of Kazakhstan PR Professionals PR-шы and a former editor-in-chief of Fashion Collection magazine Kazakhstan edition (2010-2015). Aleksandrov was acknowledged as one of the most influential people in Kazakhstan fashion and fashion media.

Early life 
Roman Aleksandrov was born in 1976 to Aleksander Aleksandrov, music theory professor who trained Ruslan Butabayev, leader of the popular Kazakhstan orchestra Zaratushtra Band, and a music teacher.

In 2007 Aleksandrov earned a degree in journalism from Manash Kozybayev North Kazakhstan State University.

Career

Television 
Roman Aleksandrov established himself in television by serving as news editor on North Kazakhstan bureau of Kazakhstan (channel) state broadcast television network.

In 2003 he moved to Almaty and continued his work as a reporter of the flagship evening television news program Informbureau» on Kazakhstan Channel 31.

In March 2004 Roman Aleksandrov was hired in Alma Media, Dariga Nazarbayeva's mass media holding company. There he was combined duties of a reporter and culture and socialite editor of Evening News on KTK channel and Channel One Eurasia. In December Aleksandrov became the chief-editor and host of Show Boom, a daily entertainment newscast on KTK primarily reporting on celebrity news and gossip, along with social life reviews and some news about the entertainment industry in general.

Soon Aleksandrov was confirmed as an official person on KTK channel while his fame and popularity increased dramatically. Having analysed the high ratings Show Boom project had enjoyed heads of HiT TV music television channel invited Roman Aleksandrov in 2008 to executive produce its two flagship shows – Change On Demand, a makeover reality television series and In The Highlight, a television tabloid program about social life, fashion and celebrities. Aleksandrov eventually accepted and occupied multiple positions there – producer, chief-editor and anchor.

Radio 
Simultaneously with television activity Roman Aleksandrov was involved in radio programs production. Since 2005 to 2010 he wrote and hosted Fashion FM program on Kazakhstan radio Energy 102.2 FM.

Magazines 
In 2004 Roman Aleksandrov joined the first editorial team of Kazakhstan edition of Harper's Bazaar women's fashion magazine under Maria Podgorbunskaya's editorship and was assigned as the first culture and socialite editor.

Since 2005 to 2007 Aleksandrov regularly published his columns in Kazakhstan weekly newspaper GazetaKZ.

In 2006 Aleksandrov contributed to Vintage, Kazakhstan fashion magazine serving as fashion editor.

In September 2010 Roman Aleksandrov took over Kazakhstan edition of Fashion Collection Russian fashion magazine. Once in charge of Fashion Collection Kazakhstan Aleksandrov introduced the new concept of social events — fashion brunches. On behalf of the magazine he presided in the jury of designers' contests and appeared on other important events.

Five years later, in 2015 году Aleksandrov came to decision to transfer to Vintage Kazakhstan fashion magazine. His new assignment drew everybody's attention in Kazakhstan media community. However, due to long creative disputes with Karashash Dzhuzeyeva, publisher and owner of Vintage magazine Roman Aleksandrov resigned leaving the magazine with a brand new concept, general style improvements and increase in high quality content.

References

External links
 Fashion Collection editor-in-chief Roman Aleksandrov
 
 

1976 births
Living people
Fashion editors
People from Petropavl
Kazakhstani people of Russian descent